Pipistrellini is a tribe of bats in the family Vespertilionidae. It contains several genera found throughout the Old World and Australasia, including the pipistrelles, noctules and related species.

Species 
Species in the tribe include:

 Genus Glischropus – thick-thumbed bats
 Dark thick-thumbed bat, Glischropus aquilus
 Indochinese thick-thumbed bat, Glischropus bucephalus
 Javan thick-thumbed bat, Glischropus javanus
 Common thick-thumbed bat, Glischropus tylopus
 Genus Nyctalus – noctule bats
 Birdlike noctule, Nyctalus aviator
 Azores noctule, Nyctalus azoreum
 Japanese noctule, Nyctalus furvus
 Greater noctule bat, Nyctalus lasiopterus
 Lesser noctule, Nyctalus leisleri
 Mountain noctule, Nyctalus montanus
 Common noctule, Nyctalus noctula
 Chinese noctule, Nyctalus plancyi
 Genus Pipistrellus – Pipistrelles or Pipistrelle bats
 Japanese pipistrelle, Pipistrellus abramus
 Forest pipistrelle, Pipistrellus adamsi
 Mount Gargues pipistrelle, Pipistrellus aero
 Angulate pipistrelle, Pipistrellus angulatus
 Kelaart's pipistrelle, Pipistrellus ceylonicus
 Greater Papuan pipistrelle, Pipistrellus collinus
 Indian pipistrelle, Pipistrellus coromandra
 Crete pipistrelle, Pipistrellus creticus
 Dhofar pipistrelle, Pipistrellus dhofarensis
 Endo's pipistrelle, Pipistrellus endoi
 Hanaki's dwarf bat, Pipistrellus hanaki
 Dusky pipistrelle, Pipistrellus hesperidus
 Aellen's pipistrelle, Pipistrellus inexspectatus
 Java pipistrelle, Pipistrellus javanicus
 Kuhl's pipistrelle, Pipistrellus kuhlii
 Madeira pipistrelle, Pipistrellus maderensis
 Minahassa pipistrelle, Pipistrellus minahassae
 †Christmas Island pipistrelle, Pipistrellus murrayi
 Tiny pipistrelle, Pipistrellus nanulus
 Nathusius's pipistrelle, Pipistrellus nathusii
 Lesser Papuan pipistrelle, Pipistrellus papuanus
 Mount Popa pipistrelle, Pipistrellus paterculus
 Dar es Salaam pipistrelle, Pipistrellus permixtus
 Common pipistrelle, Pipistrellus pipistrellus
 Soprano pipistrelle, Pipistrellus pygmaeus
 Rusty pipistrelle, Pipistrellus rusticus
 Simandou pipistrelle, Pipistrellus simandouensis
 Narrow-winged pipistrelle, Pipistrellus stenopterus
 †Sturdee's pipistrelle, Pipistrellus sturdeei
 Least pipistrelle, Pipistrellus tenuis
 Watts's pipistrelle, Pipistrellus wattsi
 Northern pipistrelle, Pipistrellus westralis
 Genus Scotoecus - house bats
 White-bellied lesser house bat, Scotoecus albigula
 Light-winged lesser house bat, Scotoecus albofuscus
 Hinde's lesser house bat, Scotoecus hindei
 Dark-winged lesser house bat, Scotoecus hirundo
 Desert yellow bat, Scotoecus pallidus
 Genus Scotozous
 Dormer's bat, Scotozous dormeri
 Genus Vansonia
 Rüppell's bat, Vansonia rueppellii

References 

Mammal tribes
Vesper bats
Taxa named by George Henry Hamilton Tate